Meesden is a village and civil parish of the East Hertfordshire district of Hertfordshire, England. Nearby settlements include Anstey and Brent Pelham.

Meesden's Grade II* listed church is dedicated to St Mary.

See also
 The Hundred Parishes

References

External links 
 Listed buildings in Meesden, British Listed Buildings
 "Meesden Hertfordshire", A Vision of Britain through Time
 "Meesden", Genuki

Villages in Hertfordshire
Civil parishes in Hertfordshire
East Hertfordshire District